Cossack with rifle, sometimes as Knight with rifle or Cossack with musket is a former national emblem of the Cossack Hetmanate (Zaporozhian Host).<ref>Savchuk, Yu. Coat of Arms of the Malorussian Nation (ГЕРБ МАЛОРОСІЙСЬКОЇ НАЦІЇ). Encyclopedia of History of Ukraine.</ref> In 20th century it was the official national emblem of Ukrainian State.

 Overlook 

The literal translation of the emblem is "Knight with improvised weapon". However, samopal more precisely here means a general rifle rather than an improvised firearm. According to an arts studies specialist, samopal used to refer to any rifle but musket or carbine.

The origin of the emblem is uncertain, while its first records date back to 1592. On the initiative of Pyotr Rumyantsev the emblem was phased out and replaced with the Russian double-head eagle in 1767.

The Cossack with rifle was recovered by the Hetman of Ukraine Pavlo Skoropadskyi in 1918. However, later the emblem disappeared again until in 2005 it reappeared on the proposed Great Seal of Ukraine.

According to the Constitution of Ukraine, the emblem has to be included into the Great Seal of Ukraine.

Description
Based on images of the Zaporizhian Host Coat of Arms, they define four iconographic types of the base coat of arms figure (cossack):
 Coat of Arms of Host (before 1648) body and head is turned three quarters to the left, feet pacing to the left, right arm hangs freely at a hip, left – holds stock of rifle at 45° angle to body
 Coat of Arms of Zaporizhian Host Municipal (1648–1670, Cossack Hetmanate) body and head is turned three quarters to the left, feet at shoulder width forward, right arm behind back, left – holds stock of rifle at 45° angle to body
 Coat of Arms of Zaporizhian Host Municipal (1670–1766, Left-bank Ukraine) body and head is turned three quarters to the left, feet at shoulder width forward, right arm at waist, left – holds stock of rifle at 90° angle to body
 Coat of Arms of Zaporizhian Host Lower (1670–1775, Zaporizhian Sich) body and head is turned three quarters to the left, feet at shoulder width forward, right arm at waist, left – holds stock of rifle at 90° angle to body, left near cossack available spear (at later versions to the left of the spear a structure)

Gallery

 See also 
 Coat of arms of Ukraine

Notes

References

External links
 Tetiana Poshyvailo. "Kozak Mamai" among his deeds. Center of folklorist studies "Kozak Mamai". February 4, 2010 (accessed October 10, 2013).
 Oleksiy Strukevych. Abolishment of the Hetmanate Coat of Arms. Center of folklorist studies "Kozak Mamai". August 11, 2008 (accessed October 11, 2013).
 Odnorozhenko, O. Cossack Heraldry (Козацька геральдика). Haidamaka portal. (accessed July 25, 2017)
 Hudymenko, Yu. Flags of our ancestors (Флаги наших отцов)''. TSN. 31 March

Cossack Hetmanate
Heraldic charges
National symbols of Ukraine
Ukrainian coats of arms
Ukrainian culture